Uxbridge is a township in the Regional Municipality of Durham in south-central Ontario, Canada.

Communities
The main centre in the township is the namesake community of Uxbridge. Other settlements within the township include Altona, Coppin's Corners, Forsythe Glenn, Glasgow, Glen Major, Goodwood, Leaskdale, Quaker Village, Roseville, Sandford, Siloam, Udora, and Zephyr.

History
It was named for Uxbridge, England, a name which was derived from "Wixan's Bridge".

The first settlers in the area were Quakers who started arriving in 1806 from the Catawissa area of Pennsylvania. The community's oldest building, the Uxbridge Friends Meeting House, was built in 1820 and overlooks the town from Quaker Hill, a kilometre to the west.

The township was incorporated as a municipality in 1850 and became part of the newly formed Ontario County two years later.

The first passenger-carrying narrow-gauge railway in North America, the Toronto and Nipissing Railway arrived in Uxbridge in June 1871, and for over a decade Uxbridge was the headquarters of the railway.  In 1872, the Village of Uxbridge was separated from the Township and incorporated as a separate entity.

With the creation of the Regional Municipality of Durham in 1974, Uxbridge Township was amalgamated with the Town of Uxbridge and Scott Township to create an expanded Township of Uxbridge.

Uxbridge today
Today, Uxbridge is as a mostly suburban community in northern Durham Region. Major manufacturing employers include Pine Valley Packaging (packaging, containers and portable shelters), Koch-Glitsch Canada (mass transfer systems) and Hela Canada (spice and ingredient manufacture). Uxbridge area is also home to many small industrial businesses, cultivation farms and beekeeping organizations. Many residents commute to other centres in Durham and York Regions and beyond.

The 30-bed Uxbridge Cottage Hospital opened in 1958 is a site associated with the Markham Stouffville Hospital Corporation.

Uxbridge is twinned with Catawissa, Pennsylvania, in the United States, from which many of its settlers originated.

Uxbridge has three community newspapers: the Uxbridge Times Journal, the Standard and the Cosmos. Uxbridge is also served by a monthly community magazine and events guide, Uxbridge Town Talk.

Coat of Arms

The motto is an abbreviation of “On to it Uxbridge,” meaning “Let’s go Uxbridge.” It refers to Ontario through the abbreviation “Ont.,” while being a rallying call for the township and its residents to move forward into the future with confidence.

Demographics 

English is the mother tongue of 91.7% of the population, whereas French, the other official language, of 1.0%. German is the mother tongue of 1.4% of the residents of Uxbridge, while native speakers of Italian make up 1.0% of the population.

Attractions

Uxbridge trails run through and alongside historic villages, mixed forests, meadows, ponds, streams, and wetlands. A number of major trail systems run through the Township, including the Oak Ridges Trail and the Trans-Canada Trail.

The Uxbridge Historical Centre (formerly Uxbridge-Scott Museum and Archives) possesses a number of artifacts, mostly related to the township's agricultural heritage and of the town's Quaker heritage. The museum also includes ten heritage buildings as well as heritage herb and flower gardens. It offers seasonal events, workshops, and specialty programs. It was formed in 1972 by the Uxbridge-Scott Historical Society, who holds an annual Heritage Day festival to supports the museum.

There are also a number of attractions related to the history of the area. Uxbridge's Elgin Park, named after Lord Elgin, was the site of a picnic held by 19th century Prime Minister John A. Macdonald in a re-election bid. In addition, the Thomas Foster Memorial Temple, erected in 1935-36 by the former mayor of Toronto, is situated a short distance north of town. Inspired by Foster's visit to India, the Temple was designed by architects J.H. Craig (1889–1954) and H.H. Madrill (1889–1998). Finally, the former home of famed author Lucy Maud Montgomery of Anne of Green Gables fame is situated in Leaskdale. Montgomery lived in the area from 1911 to 1926, and wrote half of her books at what is now the site of the Leaskdale Manse Museum.

Since 1995, the Lions Club has hosted Art in the Park, held the second week in August. Also known as Summerfest, this juried art show attracts artists from across the province.

Ski Resorts
Skiing in Uxbridge area began in 1938 by the Toronto Ski Club when it rented 400 acres of the Pugh family farm until 1948 and then operated by the Pughs' until it was abandoned.

Today there are three ski resorts, all located within a short distance of one another:

 Dagmar Ski Resort - largest of the three resorts and was established by the Toronto Ski Club
 Lakeridge Ski Resort - located north of Dagmar was opened in 1989 following Toronto Ski Club acquisition of part of the former Pugh family farm in 1983 
 Skyloft - smallest of the three resorts and located on property just northwest of Lakeridge; it was the site of the original Toronto Ski Club's first ski area on the original Pugh farm

Uxbridge Fall Fair
The Uxbridge Fall Fair has been held annually since 1886.  Attractions include home craft, vegetable and flower exhibits, cattle, goat, sheep, poultry and rabbit shows, the midway, tractor pull, demolition derby, heavy horse pull and barnyard rodeo.

Other attractions
The Uxbridge Studio Tour and Sale is also held in September, giving visitors an opportunity to meet with local artists in their studios and explore the creative process.

Since 1988, Uxbridge has hosted an annual Heritage Christmas Craft Show, held the second Saturday in November. A Santa Claus Parade is also held annually in late November.

Since 2008 there has been an annual Uxbridge Ribfest, usually during a middle weekend of July. It was run by the town branch of the Royal Canadian Legion (Branch 170)  But since 2015, has been organized by the Bonner Boys, a local community group.

The York Durham Heritage Railway, opened in 1996, is a tourist train operating between Stouffville and Uxbridge. The train is pulled by first generation diesel locomotives which directly replaced the steam locomotives. They have recently purchase 5 Budd RDC railcars from the now defunct Guelph Junction Express.

Throughout the year, a number of theatrical and musical productions are held at the Music Hall. Movies are shown at a local unique movie theatre, named The Roxy.

The Highlands of Durham Games are held in Elgin Park near the end of July. These games focus on Celtic traditions and offer a variety of entertainments.

Once a Year the Uxbridge Optimists host the Fantasy of Lights. This is a drive-through light show through Elgin Park in which you see a variety of different displays and takes about 20 minutes to drive through. This event takes place once a year from December 4 to January 2.

Transport
Uxbridge station is the northern terminus of the York Durham Heritage Railway, which runs from Stouffville.  The Stouffville line of GO Transit is proposed to be extended to Uxbridge (As part of MoveOntario 2020 plan), but is currently served by buses to the GO Transit station at Lincolnville. The expansion is currently unfunded, and could cost as much as $350 million. Durham Region Transit also runs buses through Uxbridge every hour from Route 950 (Uxbridge/Port Perry/Ontario Tech.) and limited service via community bus route (Uxbridge East
Uxbridge West).

Local government 

The Township of Uxbridge has five wards, each represented by an elected council member. As of 2022, the mayor is Dave Barton and the Regional Councillor is Gord Highet.

Education

Public elementary schools

 Joseph Gould Public School
 Quaker Village Public School
 Scott Central Public School
 Uxbridge Public School
 Goodwood Public School

Separate elementary schools
 St. Joseph's Catholic School

Independent schools
 Uxbridge Montessori School

High schools
 Uxbridge Secondary School

Colleges
 Durham College (North Campus Uxbridge on 2 Campbell Drive, an office building next to Uxbridge Cottage Hospital) plus Ontario Employment Services Centre on Brock Street.

Historical figures
 Joseph Gould, farmer, businessman and political figure in Ontario (member of the Legislative Council of the Province of Canada 1854-1861 and Warden of Ontario County. 
 Isaac James Gould, son of Joseph Gould, Ontario MPP and federal MP.
 Lucy Maud Montgomery, Canadian author, best known for a series of novels beginning with Anne of Green Gables, published in 1908, lived in Uxbridge from around 1911 to 1926.
 Laura Secord, Canadian hero during the War of 1812, was granted  of land in Uxbridge but never resided there.

Notable people
 Ted Barris, author and CBC Radio host
Mary J. L. Black, librarian and suffragist
 Chris Begg, pitched for Canada's baseball team at the 2004 and 2008 Olympic games
 Christopher Chapman, film writer, director, editor and cinematographer
 Hayden Christensen, actor
 Leah Daniels, country singer/songwriter
 Jeff Keeping, former professional Canadian football defensive tackle and offensive lineman for the Toronto Argonauts of the Canadian Football League
 Bryan Marchment, former NHL player with nine different teams, now a scout for the San Jose Sharks
 Robyn Ottolini, country singer and songwriter
 Jessica Phoenix, equestrian, competed in the 2012 London Summer Olympics
 Dan Pollard, broadcaster for NHL network and CBC Radio, and commentator for the Peterborough Petes
 Gary Roberts, former NHL player with the Calgary Flames and the Toronto Maple Leafs
 Jim Zoet, professional basketball player

In film
 The 1972 film The House Without a Christmas Tree starring Jason Robards was filmed in Uxbridge at Peel and Victoria. The house and school are located here. The 2nd film in the series, entitled The Thanksgiving Treasure, also used the same house.
 The 1975 film Sudden Fury used the old gas station/store in Siloam for a major segment of filming.
 The show 'The Littlest Hobo' (a show about a lone dog's travails) was one of the first shows to use Uxbridge for on location shooting in the 1980s.
The CBC's series Road to Avonlea was shot on location at an exterior village set located in Uxbridge.
 The 1995 TV series Once Upon a Hamster (65 episodes) broadcast on Canada's YTV and UK's Channel 4 was filmed on location in Uxbridge.
 The 1996 film Christmas in My Hometown, starring Tim Matheson and Melissa Gilbert, was partially filmed in Uxbridge.
 The 1996 film The Long Kiss Goodnight starring Geena Davis and Samuel L. Jackson was partially filmed in Uxbridge.
 The 1996 film The Stupids starring Tom Arnold was partially filmed in Uxbridge.
 The 1998 film Jerry and Tom starring Joe Mantegna and Sam Rockwell was partially filmed in Uxbridge.
 The 1999 film A Map of the World starring Sigourney Weaver and Julianne Moore was partially filmed in Uxbridge.
 The 2001 film Driven starring Sylvester Stallone and Burt Reynolds was partially filmed in Uxbridge.
 The 2001 film Serendipity starring John Cusack, Kate Beckinsale, and Jeremy Piven was partially filmed in Uxbridge.
 The 2001 film Prancer Returns starring John Corbett, Stacy Edwards, Michael O'Keefe, Jack Palance, and Gavin Fink was partially filmed in Uxbridge.
 The 2002 film Undercover Brother starring Eddie Griffin, Denise Richards, and Dave Chappelle was partially filmed in Uxbridge.
 The 2002 film Men With Brooms with Paul Gross, Leslie Nielsen, and Connor Price was partially filmed in Uxbridge
 The 2004 film The Prince & Me starring Julia Stiles was partially filmed in Uxbridge.
 The 2005 film A History of Violence starring Viggo Mortensen was partially filmed in Uxbridge.
 The 2006 film Cow Belles starring Aly Michalka, AJ Michalka was filmed in Uxbridge.
 The 2007 film Lars and the Real Girl starring Ryan Gosling was partially filmed in Uxbridge.
 The 2009 film Grey Gardens starring Drew Barrymore and Jessica Lange was partially filmed in Uxbridge.
 The 2015 TV series Schitt's Creek was filmed on location in Goodwood.
The 2021 film Awake, starring Gina Rodriguez was partially filmed in Uxbridge.

See also
List of townships in Ontario

References

External links

Township municipalities in Ontario
Lower-tier municipalities in Ontario
Municipalities in the Regional Municipality of Durham
Populated places established in 1806